Thirteen Masks is the solo debut record by Jarboe, released in 1991 through Hyperium. The album features Swans members Michael Gira, Norman Westberg, Clinton Steele, and Tony Maimone of Pere Ubu.

Track listing

Personnel 
Musicians
Michael Gira – electronics, bass guitar and production (3, 6, 8, 10, 13), mastering
Jarboe – vocals, keyboards, electronics, percussion, production (1, 3, 5, 7, 9, 11, 12, 14)
Tony Maimone – bass guitar (8)
Lary Seven – instruments, production and engineering (1, 5, 9)
Clinton Steele – guitar (6, 8, 11, 12, 14), production (12)
J. G. Thirlwell – sampler, programming, arrangement and production (2)
Norman Westberg – guitar (10)

Production
Bryce Goggin – mastering, engineering (2)
Donald Hassler – engineering (7)
Steve McAllister – engineering (4)
Roli Mosimann – drum programming and production (6, 8, 10, 13)
Mark Richardson – production (3), engineering (11, 12, 14)
Al Smith – engineering (6, 8)
Wharton Tiers – engineering (10, 13)

References

External links 
 

1991 debut albums
Jarboe albums
Albums produced by JG Thirlwell
Albums produced by Roli Mosimann
Albums produced by Michael Gira
Albums produced by Jarboe
Post-rock albums by American artists